Naháč is a village and municipality of Trnava District in the Trnava region of Slovakia.

Famous people
Juraj Fándly, writer

References

External links
http://en.e-obce.sk/obec/nahac/nahac.html
http://www.obecnahac.sk in 

Villages and municipalities in Trnava District